Countess of Suffolk is the title given to the wife of the Earl of Suffolk. Women who have held the title include:

Katherine de Stafford (c.1376–1419)
Catherine Howard, Countess of Suffolk (1564–1638)
Barbara Howard, Countess of Suffolk (1622–1680)
Henrietta Howard, Countess of Suffolk (died 1715)
Henrietta Howard, Countess of Suffolk (1689–1767)
Sarah Howard, Countess of Suffolk (died 1776)
Julia Howard, Countess of Suffolk and Berkshire (1737–1819)
Margaret Howard, Countess of Suffolk  (1879–1968)